The discography of Kandi Burruss consists of two studio albums, five singles, and four music videos, as well as her work as a songwriter and producer.

Burruss was part of the 1990s girl group Xscape and debuted as a solo recording artist in 2000 with her album Hey Kandi. The album peaked at #72 on the Billboard 200 and sold more than 260,000 copies in the United States. Her second album, Kandi Koated, was released in 2010. Burruss also released the Fly Above EP on October 29, 2009.

Studio albums

Extended plays

Singles

As lead artist

As featured performer

Other appearances

Songwriting credits 
Note: This chart only features Burruss's work according to the ASCAP database. Some songs, names of the performers, and complete info on Burruss's work on the song may be missing.

References

 

Production discographies
Discographies of American artists
Rhythm and blues discographies
Hip hop discographies